The ICRC International T20 Cricket Tournament was a five-team Twenty20 cricket competition for people with physical disabilities. It was held from 2–10 September 2015 in Dhaka, Bangladesh. Organised by the International Committee of the Red Cross (ICRC) in partnership with the Ministry of Youth and Sports, the Bangladesh Cricket Board, and Bangladesh Krira Shikkha Protishtan, it is the first multi team tournament of its kind. Its slogan was ‘We Can Do It Too’. Prime Minister Sheikh Hasina inaugurated the tournament at the Sher-e-Bangla National Cricket Stadium (SBNCS) and Mashrafe Bin Mortaza was the brand ambassador

The opening game, between hosts Bangladesh and  England, due to be played at the National Cricket Stadium (SBNCS) was rained, called off and postponed to the main tournament played at the Bangladesh Krira Shikkha Protishtan 3 & 4 grounds. The competing teams were Bangladesh, India (All India Cricket Association for the Physically Challenged), Pakistan (Pakistan Disabled Cricket Association), Afghanistan and England (ECB); all the teams but India's were recognised by their national cricket board. Ten matches were played in round-robin format, with a final played between the two best teams. England beat Pakistan in the final to become the champions in the inaugural edition of the International physically disabled cricket tournament and the physiotherapist for the  England physically disabled cricket team was Catherine Smaill, a former Scottish woman cricketer.

The Bangladesh team were selected from a talent hunt camp organised by the ICRC in March 2015.

See also 
 Disability in Bangladesh
 Wheelchair Cricketers Welfare Association of Bangladesh

References

External links 
 Event official Facebook page
 

2015 in cricket
International cricket competitions in Bangladesh
Parasports competitions
Twenty20 International cricket competitions